Commissioners Flat is a rural locality in the Moreton Bay Region, Queensland, Australia.

Geography 
The eastern border is marked by the Stanley River.  Peachester State Forest occupies the eastern half of Commissioners Flat.

Burgalba Lagoon is a waterhole. The lagoon is significant for the Dallambara, who were a clan of the Jinibara people. It was a place of testing young men and making rain. It was the home of Gairwar the rainbow serpent and a source of magic stones. The name  Burgalba means "box tree".

History 
It was named after Stephen Simpson, the Queensland commissioner of lands, who used the area as a camp site in the mid-19th century.  Although the normal rules of English grammar would suggest that the locality name should be spelled with a possessive apostrophe, the official titles of place names in Queensland do not include that particular punctuation.

References

Suburbs of Moreton Bay Region
Localities in Queensland